The United Provinces of the Río de la Plata, earlier known as the United Provinces of South America, was a name adopted in 1816 by the Congress of Tucumán for the region of South America that declared independence in 1816, with the Sovereign Congress taking place in 1813, during the Argentine War of Independence (1810–1818) that began with the May Revolution in 1810. It originally comprised rebellious territories of the former Spanish Viceroyalty of the Río de la Plata dependencies and had Buenos Aires as its capital. 

The name "Provincias del Río de la Plata" (formally adopted during the Cortes of Cádiz to designate the Viceroyalty of the Río de la Plata) alludes to the Junta Provisional Gubernativa de las Provincias del Río de la Plata  or Primera Junta. The Argentine National Anthem refers to the state as "the United Provinces of the South". The Constitution of Argentina recognises Provincias Unidas del Río de la Plata as one of the official names of the country, referred to as "Argentine Nation" (Nación Argentina) in modern legislation.

Description
The United Provinces of South America were bordered on the south by the sparsely populated territories of the Pampas and Patagonia, home to the Mapuche, Ranquel and Puelche peoples. To the north, the Gran Chaco was populated by the Guaycuru nations. To the northwest, across the Upper Peru, lay the Spanish Viceroyalty of Peru. Across the Andes, to the west, was the Spanish-controlled Captaincy General of Chile. To the northeast was Colonial Brazil, a part of the Portuguese Empire (in 1815, the United Kingdom of Portugal, Brazil and the Algarves), later the Empire of Brazil in 1821.

Government
The change from the Viceroyalty into the United Provinces was not merely a change of governors, but a revolutionary process that would replace the Spanish monarchy with an independent republic. 

The main influences in this were the Enlightenment in Spain, promoting new ideas, and the Peninsular War that left Spain without a legitimate king after the Abdications of Bayonne. The concept of separation of powers gradually became a tool to prevent despotism.

The new political situation generated great political conflict between the cities for two reasons. First, the vacatio regis of Ferdinand VII and the French King of Spain, Joseph Bonaparte, there was no clear view about who was the king. Some people thought that it passed to other offices of the Spanish monarchy, while others held the notion of the retroversion of the sovereignty to the people: sovereignty returned to the people, who had now the right to self-governance temporally. 

But, in 1810 under the establishment of the new doctrine of popular sovereignty throughout the Spanish empire, the Spanish government summoned all the nations of America and Spain, to establish Spanish courts for the whole empire, but on the contrary, the patriots, under the same right of popular sovereignty, thought that any nation, both in Spain and America, had the right to self-government and to establish their own country.

History

The freedom of the Provinces of the Río de la Plata was established through a lengthy process that started in May 1810, when the citizens and militias of Buenos Aires, the capital city of the Spanish Viceroyalty of the Río de la Plata, ousted the Viceroy Baltasar Hidalgo de Cisneros in the May Revolution. Although there was not a declaration of independence at the time, and the government that emerged from the revolution declared loyalty to the king Ferdinand VII, in fact it attempted to reorganise the social, political and economic structures of the Provinces of the Río de la Plata. As it faced immediate resistance in some quarters (namely the Banda Oriental, under the new Spanish Viceroy Javier de Elío, Córdoba and Santiago de Liniers, the local government of Asunción in Paraguay and, notably, the royalist forces from the Viceroyalty of Perú), the revolution soon turned to be a War of Independence.

In the midst of the war of independence, during the entire 1810–1831 period there were serious conflicts among ever-changing factions regarding the organization of the state and the political aims of the revolutionary governments. These conflicts involved coups d'état, mutinies, politically motivated trials, banishments and imprisonments and finally developed into an outright civil war.

Initial revolutionary governments

Ever since the revolution, there were serious conflicts among diverging views regarding the political organization of the provinces. While some advocated a strong and executive central government with little accountability to the regional interests, a position at first favored by the "enlightened" revolutionary and independentist elements, others sought to integrate representatives from the provinces in a larger deliberative assembly. As the latter position gained the upper hand, the Primera Junta grew to incorporate delegates from the provinces in 1811. However, as it became evident that such an arrangement was not effective enough to lead the war efforts, a triumvirate assumed executive powers while the assembly retained some controlling functions.

Assembly of the year XIII

Supreme Directorship

Declaration of independence

Liga Federal

The Liga Federal (1815–1820), or Liga de los Pueblos Libres (League of the Free Peoples), was an alliance of provinces in what is now Argentina and Uruguay, organised under democratic federalist ideals strongly advocated by its leader, José Gervasio Artigas.

The government of the United Provinces of South America felt threatened by the growing appeal of the Liga Federal, so they did nothing to repel the incoming Portuguese invasion of Misiones Orientales and the Banda Oriental, the stronghold of Artigas. Brazilian General Carlos Frederico Lecor, thanks to their numerical and material superiority, defeated Artigas and his army and occupied Montevideo on January 20, 1817, but the struggle continued for three long years in the countryside. Infuriated by the passivity of Buenos Aires, Artigas declared war on Buenos Aires while he was losing to the Portuguese.

On February 1, 1820, Federal League governors Francisco Ramírez of Entre Ríos and Estanislao López of Santa Fe, defeated a Supreme Directorship diminished army, ending the centralized government of the United Provinces, and established a federal agreement with Buenos Aires Province. Similarly, the Federal League effectively came to an end when its constituent provinces rejoined the United Provinces.

Artigas, defeated by the Portuguese, retreated to Entre Ríos. From there, he denounced the Treaty of Pilar and entered into conflict with his former ally governor Ramírez, who crushed the remnants of Artigas' army. The former Protector of the Free Peoples was exiled in Paraguay until his death. The Eastern Province was annexed by Portugal to its Brazilian dependences in 1821.

Anarchy of the year XX

First presidency

War with Brazil and Independence of Uruguay

Resumption of the Civil War

Break up of the Viceroyalty of the Río de la Plata 
The result of the wars was the independence of the provinces. Several new nations appeared, there were:

Bolivia
Five provinces would go on to become Bolivia:
Charcas,
Cochabamba,
Mizque,
Chichas, and
Tarija.

Uruguay
The Eastern Province became independent as Uruguay as a consequence of the treaty of Montevideo, partly retaining its old name in its official name: the Eastern Republic of Uruguay. Due to the text of the aforementioned treaty, United Provinces and Imperial Brazil both renounced their claims to the province and agreed to grant it independence, but the treaty did not include nor ask the Orientals' opinion, and also omitted to detail the borders of the new state what would give Brazil a chance to move its borders further south. The Constitutional Assembly approved the Constitution of Uruguay on 10 September 1829 and it was sworn by the citizens on 18 July 1830.

Brazil
Misiones Orientales, after years of Portuguese domain, were recovered with the 1828 Campaign of Fructuoso Rivera at the Misiones Orientales, but it was de jure recognized as Brazilian, following the outcome of the Cisplatine War.

Argentina
Following a long civil war, the following provinces joined to become the Argentine Republic:
Buenos Aires (The outpost of Carmen de Patagones in Patagonia is now part of Buenos Aires Province),
Catamarca,
Córdoba,
Corrientes,
Entre Ríos,
Jujuy,
La Rioja,
Mendoza,
Salta,
San Juan,
San Luis,
Santa Fe,
Santiago del Estero, and
Tucumán.

See also 
 Name of Argentina
 Second Triumvirate (Argentina)
 Viceroyalty of Rio de la Plata
 Rise of the Argentine Republic
 Argentine War of Independence

References

Bibliography

 Símbolos Nacionales de la República Argentina 

 
Argentine War of Independence
Former political divisions related to Argentina
Former countries in South America
Colonial Argentina
Colonial Uruguay
Political history of Argentina
Political history of Uruguay
Río de la Plata
19th century in Argentina
1816 establishments in Argentina
1831 in Argentina
States and territories established in 1816
States and territories disestablished in 1831
1810s in Argentina
1820s in Argentina
1830s in Argentina
1810s in Uruguay
1820s in Uruguay
1830s in Uruguay
1810 establishments in South America
1831 disestablishments in South America